Bill Friday may refer to:

 William C. Friday (1920–2012), American educator
 Bill Friday (ice hockey), retired Canadian ice hockey referee